Oenoa or Oinoa (Οἰνόα or Οἰνώα) may refer to:
Oenoa (Argolis) (Οἰνώα), a town of ancient Argolis, Greece
Oenoa (Locris) (Οἰνόα), a town of ancient Locris, Greece